The Holoptilinae are a subfamily of Reduviidae (assassin bugs) known as feather-legged bugs or ant wolves. Several members of the subfamily specialize on ants.  About 16 genera (one fossil) are known, with about 80 species described.  Species in the Holoptilini tribe possess a specialized organ called a trichome to attract ants.

Three tribes are included in the subfamily - Aradellini, Dasycnemini, and Holoptilini.

Genera

Aradelloides Malipatil, 1983
Aradellus Westwood
Dasycnemus
Holoptilus
Holoptiloides
Rudbeckocoris
†Praecoris dominicana Poinar, 1991
Ptilocerus  
Ptilocnemus Westwood

References

Reduviidae
Hemiptera subfamilies